Nunnelly is an unincorporated community in Hickman County, Tennessee, United States. Nunnelly has a post office, with ZIP code 37137.

References

Unincorporated communities in Hickman County, Tennessee
Unincorporated communities in Tennessee